The Lancia Rally (Tipo 151, also known as the Lancia Rally 037, Lancia 037 or Lancia-Abarth #037 from its Abarth project code SE037) was a mid-engine sports car and rally car built by Lancia in the early 1980s to compete in the FIA Group B World Rally Championship. Driven by Markku Alén, Attilio Bettega, and Walter Röhrl, the car won Lancia the manufacturers' world championship in the 1983 season. It was the last rear-wheel drive car to win the WRC.

History

In 1980 Lancia began the development of the 037 to comply with the then new FIA Group B regulations that allowed cars to race with relatively few homologation models being built. As the project name was number 037, this eventually became the name by which the car was known. Abarth, now a part of the Lancia-Fiat family, did most of the design work, even incorporating styling cues from some of its famous race cars of the 1950s and 1960s such as a double bubble roof line. The car was developed in collaboration between Pininfarina, Abarth, Dallara and the project manager, engineer Sergio Limone. Prior to its first participation in the 1982 World Rally Championship season, 200 road-going models were built to comply with Group B regulations.

The car made its competition debut at the 1982 Rally Costa Smeralda in Italy, where two cars were entered but both retired due to gearbox issues. The 1982 season was plagued with retirements for the 037, but the new car did manage to achieve several wins including its first win at the Pace Rally in the UK. The 1983 season was considerably more successful for the 037: Lancia took the 1983 World Rally Championship Constructors' title with Germany's Walter Röhrl and Finland's Markku Alén its principal drivers, despite serious competition from the 4WD Audi Quattro. Both drivers, however, missed the final round of the series, despite Röhrl maintaining a mathematical chance of the drivers' title: such honours instead went to Audi's veteran Finn, Hannu Mikkola.

For the 1984 Constructors' title defence, Lancia introduced an Evolution 2 version of the 037 with improved engine power output, but this was not enough to stem the tide of 4WD competition, losing to Audi in both 1984 championships, and again to the 4WD Peugeot 205 T16 in its final works season in 1985. Indeed, Alén collected the final 037 win, and the sole one for the E2 model, on the 1984 Tour De Corse, before it was finally pensioned off in favour of its successor, the uniquely supercharged and turbocharged 4WD Delta S4, for the season-ending RAC Rally in Great Britain. Driver Attilio Bettega died in a 037 crash in 1985. António Rodrigues won the 1984 Falperra International Hill Climb in a 037. The 037 made its final appearance in the 1986 edition of the Safari Rally by the Martini Lancia team, which was entered in place of the Delta S4 that the team used for the other rallies that year due to the team running out of time to develop the S4 for the rally.

One ex-works Lancia 037 was entered by ROSS Competition in the third round of the 1994 All Japan Grand Touring Car Championship season. The 037 performed poorly due to the car being massively underpowered against its competition in the GT1 (now GT500) class, a short-ratio five-speed gearbox and the engine not being designed to be run at high RPMs for a sustained period of time. Naohiro Furuya, who drove the 037 in that race, was able to finish the race in 12th overall and 9th in the GT1 class, albeit 7 laps down from the race-winning Team Taisan Porsche 962C and 3 laps down from the Team Gaikokuya Nissan Skyline that won in the GT2 class.

Specifications 

Similar to the concept of a silhouette racer; while the 037 was loosely based on the Lancia Montecarlo (also known as Scorpion in the US and Canadian markets) road car, they shared only the center section with all body panels and mechanical parts being significantly different. Steel subframes were used fore and aft of the 037's center section, while most of the body panels were made from Kevlar. However the 037 was designated and sold as a distinct model, not as a Montecarlo, and both the street and race versions of it were built using the same construction methods, so it does not qualify as an actual silhouette racer.

The mid-engined layout of the Montecarlo was retained, but the engine was turned 90 degrees from a transverse position to a longitudinal position. This allowed greater freedom in the design of the suspension while moving engine weight forward.

An independent double wishbone suspension was used on both the front and rear axles, with dual shock absorbers in the rear in order to cope with the stresses of high speed off road driving. The 037 is notable in Group B as it retained the rear-wheel drive layout that was nearly universal for rally cars of the pre-Group B period; nearly all subsequent successful rally cars used four-wheel drive, making the 037 the last of its kind.

Unlike its predecessor, the V6-powered Lancia Stratos HF, the first 037s had a 2.0-litre 4-cylinder supercharged engine. Based on the long stroke twin cam engine which powered earlier Fiat Abarth 131 rally cars, the four valve head was carried over from the 131 Abarth but the original two carburetors were replaced by a single large Weber carburetor in early models and later with fuel injection. The 037 features a ZF transaxle.

Lancia also chose a supercharger over a turbocharger to eliminate turbo lag and improve throttle response.

Detailed Specifications

Street car 

 Body: kevlar reinforced with fiberglass
 Weight:  in running condition
 Dimensions: length , width , height , wheelbase 
 Engine configuration: longitudinally mounted Rear mid-engine, rear-wheel-drive layout, Straight-4
 Bore X Stroke: 
 Displacement: 
 Max. power:  at 7,000 rpm
 Max. torque:  at 5,000 rpm
 Supercharger: Abarth Volumex system with pressure between 
 Lubrication: dry sump 
 Valvetrain: DOHC driven by belt, 4 valves per cylinder
 Clutch: Single dry plate, diameter  with hydraulic foot pedal
 Transmission: ZF The type claw, 5-speed plus reverse
 Differential: Self-Locking with two shafts fitted with CV joints
 Front suspension: Independent double wishbone, coil springs, gas shock absorbers and stabilizer bar
 Rear Suspension: Identical to front but with dual shock absorbers and without bar
 Wheels: Speedline 16" alloy wheels, Pirelli P7 205/55 VR 16 tires
 Steering: Rack and pinion, lubricated and shock
 Cooling: Forced with pump and radiator front
 Ignition: Electronic inductive discharge Marelli AEI 200 A

Rally car 
 Body: Polyester resin reinforced with glass fibre and flame retardant
 Weight:  in running condition
 Dimensions: length , width , height , wheelbase 
 Engine: mid-engine mounted longitudinally, 4 cylinders in line
 Displacement: 1995 cm³, 2111 cm³ (Evolution 2 only)
 Bore and Stroke:  x 90 mm,  x 93 mm (Evolution 2)
 Maximum torque:  at 5,000 rpm,  at 5,500 rpm (Evolution 2)
 Maximum power:  at 8,000 rpm,  (Evolution 2)
 Supercharger: Abarth Volumex system with pressure between 0.60 and 0.90 bar (1 bar on the Evolution 2)
 Lubrication: Forced dry sump oil tank 
 Layout: Rear-wheel-drive
 Distribution: Dual overhead cam shaft driven by belt, four valves per cylinder
 Clutch: Single dry plate with sealing metal-Valeo,  diameter with hydraulic foot pedal
 Change: Five-speed plus reverse
 Differential: ZF-Abarth type self-locking with two shafts fitted with CV joints
 Front suspension: independent wheels with two wishbone, coil springs, Bilstein gas shock absorbers and anti roll bar
 Rear Suspension: Identical to front but with dual shock absorbers and without bar
 Wheels: 
 Gravel version: Front; Speedline 15-inch front alloy wheels, 205/50 Pirelli P7 Corsa tyres. Rear; 16-inch alloy wheels with 295/60/16 tyres;
 Asphalt version: Front: 16-inch. Rear: 18-inch wheels.
 Steering: Rack and pinion with scaler
 Brakes: Brembo-Abarth disc brakes on all four wheels with alloy calipers
 Cooling: Forced with pump and radiator front
 Ignition: Electronic inductive discharge Marelli AEI 200 A

Rally results

World Rally Championship for Manufacturers - results 

Notes:

World Rally Championship - rally wins

037 Stradale 
Homologation requirements for the World Rally Championship's Group B mandated Lancia to produce at minimum 200 verifiable road-going examples in order to compete with the 037. 207 037 Stradale (Italian for "road going/for the road") cars are known to have been produced from 1982 through 1984. This road-going 037 variant was equipped with an Abarth-developed DOHC 2.0-litre (1,995 cc) 16-valve Inline-four engine, mated to an Abarth Volumex Roots-type supercharger generating  at 7,000 rpm.

Gallery

Books

References

External links

Lancia rally cars
Group B cars
Rear mid-engine, rear-wheel-drive vehicles
Cars introduced in 1982
Dallara racing cars
Abarth vehicles
Pininfarina vehicles
World Rally championship-winning cars